Christopher A. "Chris" Padilla is a former Under Secretary for International Trade within the United States Department of Commerce. From 2002-2008, Christopher Padilla worked within the Bush administration with a focus on international trade and economic issues. On September 29, 2006, he was confirmed as Assistant Secretary of Commerce for Export Administration by the U.S. Senate.

Living people
Johns Hopkins University alumni
Information Technology and Innovation Foundation
Year of birth missing (living people)
Under Secretaries of Commerce for International Trade